Neospongiococcum is a genus of green algae, in the family Chlorococcaceae.

References

External links

Scientific references

Scientific databases

 AlgaeBase
 AlgaTerra database
 Index Nominum Genericorum

Chlorococcaceae
Chlorococcaceae genera